Ruqaiya Sultan Begum (alternative spelling: Ruqayya, Ruqayyah) ( – 1626) was the first wife of the third Mughal emperor, Akbar.

Ruqaiya was a first cousin of her husband and was a Mughal princess by birth. Her father, Hindal Mirza, was the youngest brother of Akbar's father, Humayun. She was betrothed to Akbar at the age of nine and married him at 14, but remained childless throughout her marriage. She was being the first wife also known as Zan-i-Kalan. In later life, she raised Akbar and Mariam-uz-Zamani's grandson, Khurram (the future emperor Shah Jahan).

Family and lineage

Ruqaiya Sultan Begum was born into the Timurid dynasty as a Mughal princess, and was the only daughter of Mughal prince Hindal Mirza, the youngest son of the first Mughal emperor Babur from his wife Dildar Begum. Ruqaiya's mother, Sultanam Begum, was the daughter of Muhammad Musa Khwaja and the younger sister of Mahdi Khwaja, who was the brother-in-law of Emperor Babur, being the husband of his sister, Khanzada Begum. Ruqaiya was named after the Islamic Prophet Muhammad's daughter, Ruqayyah bint Muhammad.

Ruqaiya's oldest paternal uncle was the second Mughal emperor Humayun (who later became her father-in-law as well), while her most notable paternal aunt was the imperial princess, Gulbadan Begum, the author of Humayun-nama ("Book of Humayun").

Ruqaiya was a descendant of Timur or Tamerlane the Great through his son Miran Shah, like her husband Akbar.

Marriage to Akbar

On 20 November 1551, Hindal Mirza died fighting valorously for Humayun in a battle against their half-brother, Kamran Mirza's forces. Humayun was overwhelmed with grief upon the death of his youngest brother, who had expiated for his former disobedience by his blood, but his amirs consoled him by saying that his brother was blessed in having thus fallen a martyr in the service of the Emperor.

Out of affection for the memory of his brother, Humayun betrothed Hindal's nine-year-old daughter, Ruqaiya, to his son Akbar. Their betrothal took place in Kabul, Afghanistan, shortly after Akbar's first appointment as a viceroy in the province of Ghazni. On their engagement, Humayun conferred on the imperial couple, all the wealth, army and adherents of Hindal, and Ghazni, which was one of Hindal's jagir, was given to Akbar, who was appointed as its viceroy and was also given the command of his uncle's army.

During the period of political uncertainty following Humayun's death in 1556, Ruqaiya and the other female members of the imperial family were staying in Kabul. In 1557, Ruqaiya came to India and joined Akbar in Punjab, shortly after Sikandar Shah was defeated and had submitted to the Mughals. She was accompanied by her mother-in-law Hamida Banu Begum, her aunt Gulbadan Begum, and many other female members of the imperial family. Ruqaiya's marriage with Akbar was solemnized near Jalandhar, Punjab, when both of them were 14 years old. After resting for about four months in Punjab, the imperial family set out for Delhi. The Mughals were at last ready to settle down in India.

Life

Ruqaiya became Empress of the Mughal Empire at the age of fourteen years following her husband's accession to the throne in 1556. She remained childless throughout her marriage but 
was entrusted the upbringing of Akbar and Mariam-uz-Zamani's grandson, Prince Khurram (the future emperor Shah Jahan). Jagat Gosain's son Khurram, considered to be auspicious as per his astrological signs was insisted by Akbar to be raised under his care in his palace than Salim's palace and therefore was raised in Akbar's palace. He was placed under the care of his first wife Ruqaiya sultan who resided in Akbar's harem and she is stated to have raised Khurram affectionately 

Jahangir noted in his memoirs that Ruqaiya had loved his son, Khurram, "a thousand times more than if he had been her own [son]." Khurram remained with her until he had turned almost 14. After Akbar died in 1605, the young prince was then, finally, allowed to return to his father's household, and thus, returned to the care of his mother, Jagat Gosain whom he cared for and loved immensely. Khurram in his biography and court chronicles referred to his mother Bilqis Makani with the epithet 'Hazrat'. She also raised Shah Jahan's first daughter, Parhez Banu Begum.

She remained one of Akbar's chief consorts from the time of their marriage in 1557 until his death in 1605. This was primarily due to her exalted lineage, being Mirza Hindal's daughter, a Mughal princess as well as Akbar's first wife.

Once, Ruqaiya and her mother-in-law, Hamida Banu Begum, by their joint effort could not secure a pardon for a Sunni Muslim who had murdered a Shia in Lahore purely out of religious fanaticism.

In 1607, Jahangir organized a hunting trip to Kabul accompanied by his harem. Ruqaiya during this trip,  for the first time paid homage to her father's mausoleum, Hindal Mirza, and later was also buried alongside him at the Gardens of Babur in Kabul. In the same year, Sher Afghan Khan, the jagirdar of Burdwan died and his widowed wife, Mehr-un-Nissa (later Empress Nur Jahan) was summoned to Agra by Jahangir for providing her protection and was a lady in waiting to Ruqaiya Sultan. Given the precarious political connections of Sher Afghan before his death, his family was in great danger and therefore for her protection, Mehr-un-Nissa needed to be at the Mughal court in Agra. As her husband had gone down in ignominy and she could have rightly expected only the worst. Mehr-un-Nissa served as lady-in-waiting to the Ruqaiya Begum for over four years. The relationship that grew up between Ruqaiya and Mehr-un-Nissa appears to have been a tender one. The Dutch merchant and travel writer, Pieter van den Broecke, described their relationship in his Hindustan Chronicle: "This Begum [Ruqaiya] conceived a great affection for Mehr-un-Nissa [Nur Jahan]; she loved her more than others and always kept her in her company."

Death

Ruqaiya died in 1626 in Agra, at the age of eighty-four. She was buried on the fifteenth level in the Gardens of Babur (Bagh-e-Babur) in Kabul, Afghanistan beside the grave of her father Hindal Mirza as per her wish. The Gardens of Babur is the final resting place of her grandfather, Emperor Babur, as well as that of her father, Hindal Mirza.

In popular culture
Ruqaiya plays an important role in Harold Lamb's historical novel, Nur Mahal (1935).
Ruqaiya is a principal character in Indu Sundaresan's fictional novel, The Twentieth Wife (2002), as well as in its sequel, The Feast of Roses (2003).
Ruqaiya is a pivotal character in Tanushree Podder's historical novel, ''Nur Jahan's Daughter'' 2005.
Ruqaiya was portrayed by Lavina Tandon/Smiley Suri in critically acclaimed Zee TV's fictional drama Jodha Akbar.
Deepika Amin portrayed Ruqaiya in EPIC channel's fictional drama Siyaasat (based on The Twentieth Wife).
In Sony TV's historical drama Bharat Ka Veer Putra – Maharana Pratap, Ruqaiya was portrayed by Poorti Agarwal as a teenager and Falaq Naaz as an adult.
Vaishnavi Rao portrayed Ruqaiya in BIG Magic's historical drama Akbar — Rakht Se Takht Tak Ka Safar.
Tasneem Sheikh portrayed Ruqaiya in Viacom 18's Colors' fictionalised historical drama, Dastaan-E-Mohabbat: Salim Anarkali.
Padma Damodaran portrayed Ruqaiya in ZEE5's web series Taj: Divided by Blood

References 

1542 births
1626 deaths
Mughal princesses
Timurid princesses
17th-century Indian Muslims
Wives of Akbar
16th-century Indian women
16th-century Indian people
17th-century Indian women
Mughal royal consorts
Mughal royalty
Indian royalty
Indian princesses
Burials in Afghanistan